The Ljubljana Basin is a basin in the upper river basin of Sava. It is the most populated area in Slovenia and it is metropolitan area of Ljubljana. Its main rivers are the Sava, the Kamnik Bistrica and the Ljubljanica.

Cities and towns 

 Ljubljana
 Brezovica
 Škofljica
 Ig
 Vodice
 Dobrova-Polhov Gradec
 Medvode
 Kranj
 Cerklje na Gorenjskem
 Šenčur
 Naklo
 Domžale
 Trzin
 Mengeš
 Lukovica
 Moravče
 Kamnik
 Komenda
 Škofja Loka
 Železniki
 Žiri
 Vrhnika
 Grosuplje

External links